The Czechoslovak National Chess Championship was a chess competition to determine the best Czechoslovak chess player.

History 

The first Czechoslovak championships were held in Prague in 1919. After a break caused by World War II, the championships were held until 1992. 

Twelve tournaments were organized within international open tournaments;the best Czech or Czechoslovak player then won the title - such tournaments are marked with an asterisk in the following list and the overall ranking of the eventual champion in the tournament is added in brackets.

List of winners 

{| class="sortable wikitable"
! Year !! City !! Winner
|-
| 1919 || Prague || František Schubert 
|-
| 1921 || Brno || Karel Hromádka, Ladislav Prokeš, Karel Treybal
|-
| 1923 || Pardubice || Max Walter
|-
| 1925 || Bratislava || Richard Réti
|-
| 1927 || České Budějovice || Karel Opočenský
|-
| 1929 || Brno || Karel Opočenský
|-
| 1931 || Prague || Leo Zobel
|-
| 1933 || Mnichovo Hradiště || Salo Flohr
|-
| 1936 || Poděbrady*) || Salo Flohr (1st)
|-
| 1938 || Prague || Karel Opočenský
|-
|-
|	1946	||	Ostrava	||	 Luděk Pachman
|-
|	1948	||	Bratislava	||	 Emil Richter
|-
|	1950	||	Gottwaldov (now Zlín)	||	 Miroslav Filip
|-
|	1952	||	Tatranská Lomnica	||	 Miroslav Filip
|-
|	1953	||	Prague	||	 Luděk Pachman
|-
|	1954	||	Prague	||	 Miroslav Filip
|-
|	1955	||	Prague	||	 Ján Šefc
|-
|	1956	||	Poděbrady	||	 Ladislav Alster
|-
|	1957	||	Prague	||	 Luděk Pachman
|-
|	1959	||	Bratislava	||	 Luděk Pachman
|-
|	1960	||	Ostrava	||	 Jiří Fichtl
|-
|	1961	||	Košice	||	 Luděk Pachman
|-
|	1962	||	Jablonec nad Nisou	||	 Lubomír Kaválek
|-
|	1963	||	Prague	||	 Luděk Pachman
|-
|	1964	||	Brno	||	 Vlastimil Jansa
|-
|	1965	||	Pardubice	||	 Josef Augustin
|-
|	1966	||	Harrachov*)	||	 Luděk Pachman (3rd)
|-
|	1967	||	Bratislava	||	 Július Kozma
|-
|	1968	||	Luhačovice	||	 Lubomír Kaválek
|-
|	1969	||	Luhačovice*)	||	 Vlastimil Hort (3rd)
|-
|	1970	||	Havířov	||	 Vlastimil Hort
|-
|	1971	||	Luhačovice*)	||	 Vlastimil Hort (1st)
|-
|	1972	||	Třinec	||	 Vlastimil Hort
|-
|	1973	||	Luhačovice*)	||	 Jan Smejkal (1st)
|-
|	1974	||	Rimavská Sobota	||	 Vlastimil Jansa
|-
|	1975	||	Brno*)	||	 Vlastimil Hort (1st)
|-
|	1976	||	Ostrava	||	 Eduard Prandstetter
|-
|	1977	||	Děčín*)	||	 Vlastimil Hort (3rd)
|-
|	1978	||	Mariánské Lázně	||	 Eduard Prandstetter
|-
|	1979	||	Trenčianske Teplice	||	 Jan Smejkal
|-
|	1980	||	Trnava	||	 Jan Ambrož
|-
|	1981	||	Hradec Králové*)	||	 Ľubomír Ftáčnik (2nd)
|-
|	1982	||	Frenštát pod Radhoštěm	||	 Ľubomír Ftáčnik
|-
|	1983	||	Bratislava*)	||	 Ľubomír Ftáčnik (2nd)
|-
|	1984	||	Šumperk	||	 Vlastimil Jansa
|-
|	1985	||	Trenčianske Teplice*)	||	 Ľubomír Ftáčnik (2nd)
|-
|	1986	||	Prague	||	 Jan Smejkal
|-
|	1987	||	Námestovo*)	||	 Eduard Meduna (2nd)
|-
|	1988	||	Třinec	||	 Pavel Blatný
|-
|	1989	||	Prague*)	||	 Ľubomír Ftáčnik (2nd)
|-
|	1990	||	Brno	||	 Pavel Blatný
|-
|	1991	||	Bratislava	||	 Igor Gažík
|-
|	1992	||	Prague	||	 Vítězslav Rašík
|}

During World War II only the Championships of Bohemia and Moravia were held.

Multiple winners 
7 titles: Luděk Pachman (1946–1966)
6 titles: Vlastimil Hort (1969–1977)
5 titles: Ľubomír Ftáčnik (1981–1989)
3 titles: Miroslav Filip (1950–1954), Vlastimil Jansa (1964–1984), Karel Opočenský (1927–1938), Jan Smejkal (1973–1986)

Bibliography 

MODR, Břetislav - VESELÝ, Jiří: 100 let organizovaného šachu v českých zemích. Příbram, 2005. 223 p.

Notes

See also 
 Slovak Chess Championship
 Czech Chess Championship

Chess national championships
Chess in the Czech Republic
Chess in Slovakia
Sports competitions in Czechoslovakia
Chess in Czechoslovakia
1919 establishments in Czechoslovakia
1992 disestablishments in Czechoslovakia
Recurring sporting events established in 1919
Recurring sporting events disestablished in 1992